
Gmina Rzewnie is a rural gmina (administrative district) in Maków County, Masovian Voivodeship, in east-central Poland.

Villages
Gmina Rzewnie contains the villages and settlements of Bindużka, Boruty, Brzóze Duże, Brzóze Małe, Chrzanowo, Chrzczony, Dąbrówka, Drozdowo, Grudunki, Łachy Włościańskie, Łaś, Łasiewity, Małki, Mroczki-Kawki, Napiórki Butne, Napiórki Ciężkie, Nowe Drozdowo, Nowe Łachy, Nowy Sielc, Orłowo, Pruszki, Rzewnie, Słojki and Stary Sielc.

Neighbouring gminas
Gmina Rzewnie is bordered by the gminas of Czerwonka, Długosiodło, Goworowo, Obryte, Różan, Rząśnik and Szelków.

References

External links
Polish official population figures 2006

Rzewnie
Maków County